The 1945 Broadway Consolidated Liberator crash occurred on 22 November 1945 when a Royal Air Force Consolidated Liberator C Mk VIII transport crashed shortly after take-off from RAF Merryfield with the loss of all 27 on board.

The Liberator (serial number KH126) was being operated by 53 Squadron on a trooping flight from RAF Merryfield to India. It failed to gain enough height to clear a hill. It struck a tree and crashed at White's Farm near Broadway Pound, six miles from the airfield. It burst into flames with the loss of the five-man crew (all but one were Polish) and 22 Army passengers.

Investigation 
The cause of the crash was determined to be pilot error. The captain completed the first turn to the left after takeoff about 700 feet too low, at about 800 feet instead of the minimum 1,500 feet as mentioned in the departure procedures. Low visibility and poor weather conditions were considered as contributory factors.

See also
 1943 Gibraltar B-24 crash

References

Accidents and incidents involving Royal Air Force aircraft
Broadway Consolidated Liberator crash
Aviation accidents and incidents in England
Accidents and incidents involving the Consolidated B-24 Liberator
Aviation accidents and incidents caused by pilot error
Broadway Consolidated Liberator crash
Broadway Consolidated Liberator crash
Disasters in Somerset
Broadway Consolidated Liberator crash